"Miss Freelove '69" is a song by Australian rock group Hoodoo Gurus, released in February 1991 as the lead single from the group's fifth studio album, Kinky. The song peaked at number 19 on the ARIA Charts and number 3 on the Billboard Modern Rock Tracks. 

In June 2000, Dave Faulkner said "...[it] was written on the morning after the events described in the song, although I gave them some embellishment to provide a happy ending: the real police declined to join the party (at least they didn't shut it down). Miss Freelove herself was meant to be the incarnation of Bacchus but if she was anyone, she was me!".

Track listing
 7" single (RCA 105202)
 "Miss Freelove '69" — 4:02
 "Stomp the Tumbarumba" — 3:05

 CD single (CCD023)
 "Miss Freelove '69" — 4:02
 "Stomp the Tumbarumba" — 3:05
 "Brainscan" — 3:20

Personnel
 Richard Grossman — bass, backing vocals
 Dave Faulkner — lead vocals, guitar, keyboards
 Mark Kingsmill — drums, percussion
 Brad Shepherd — guitar, backing vocals, harmonica
 Producer — Hoodoo Gurus
 Engineer — Alan Thorne
 Assistant Engineers — David Mackie, Robert Hodgson
 Mixer — Ed Stasium (tracks 1 & 3), Paul Hamingson
 Mastering — Greg Calbi

Charts

Weekly charts

Year end charts

References

1991 singles
Hoodoo Gurus songs
1991 songs
Songs written by Dave Faulkner (musician)
RCA Records singles